Between Time and Timbuktu is a television film directed by Fred Barzyk and based on a number of works by Kurt Vonnegut. Produced by National Educational Television and WGBH-TV in Boston, Massachusetts, it was telecast March 13, 1972 as a NET Playhouse special.  The television script was also published in book form in 1972, illustrated with photographs by Jill Krementz and stills from the production.

The first draft of the script was written by David Odell, with contributions from Bob Elliott and Ray Goulding, and the film's director. Vonnegut himself served as an "advisor and contributor to the script." The primary title refers to a collection of poetry written by one of the main characters in Vonnegut's second novel, The Sirens of Titan.

Plot
Stony Stevenson, a young poet living with his mother, receives notice on nation-wide TV that he has won the grand prize in the Blast-Off Space Food jingle contest. The prize is a trip on the Prometheus-5 rocket into the Chrono-Synclastic Infundibulum. TV reporter Walter Gesundheit and ex-astronaut Bud Williams, Jr. explain that Stevenson was chosen for this mission because it is believed that only a poet could find the words to describe the Chrono-Synclastic Infundibulum, a type of time warp, which may hold the answer to all creation. Bud Williams, Jr. recalls that he had trouble describing Mars, comparing it to his driveway back home.

After traveling through space for six months, Astronaut Stevenson hits the Chrono-Synclastic Infundibulum, his capsule explodes, and he is scattered through time and space. While the TV correspondents struggle to remember the immortal words spoken when man first stepped on the moon, Stevenson pops in and out of a series of strange scenes (based on Vonnegut's novels and stories):

 On the island of San Lorenzo, he meets Bokonon (Cat’s Cradle), leader of a religious cult, who has given his followers a religion of harmless lies because the truth of their lives is so difficult.
 He appears among jurors at the trial of Dr. Paul Proteus (Player Piano), who is accused of waging war against modern technology and the industrial system.
 He finds himself with Dr. Hoenikker (Cat’s Cradle) and a General who discuss the military application of Ice Nine, which could freeze all water on a battlefield so soldiers would never have to fight in mud.
 He lands in a society where no one is allowed to be superior to anyone else. He sees dancers hobbled with weights struggling to perform a ballet until one dancer (“Harrison Bergeron”) rebels by removing the handicaps from himself and his partner so they can dance freely.
 He visits an Ethical Suicide Parlor in an overpopulated world (“Welcome to the Monkey House”) and meets Lionel J. Howard who wants to know one thing before he dies: “What are people for?”
 In the final episode, he hitches a ride on a fire truck with a young girl, Wanda June, who was hit by an ice-cream truck before her birthday party (Happy Birthday, Wanda June), and confronts his own death.

Cast
The televised production of the play starred William Hickey as Stony Stevenson. The rest of the cast included:
Bruce Morrow as Contest Announcer
Dortha Duckworth as Mrs. Stevenson (Stony's mother)
Ray Goulding as Walter Gesundheit
Bob Elliott as Bud Williams, Jr. (the ex-astronaut)
Franklin Cover as Col. Donald "Tex" Pirandello
Russell Morash as Sandy Abernethy
John Devlin as Dr. Bobby Denton
Kevin McCarthy as Bokonon
Edie Lynch as Island Girl
Jerry Gershman as Soldier
James Sloyan as Dr. Paul Proteus
George Serries as Prosecutor
Ashley Westcott as Deaf Juror
John Peters as Drunk
Helen Stenborg as Miss Martin
Hurd Hatfield as Dr. Hoenikker
Dolph Sweet as General
Hariet Hamilton as Lead Caroler
Sam Amato as Policeman
Benay Venuta as Diana Moon Glampers
Carlton Power as First Stagehand
Jean Sanocki as Larry
Jack Shipley as News Announcer
Alexis Hoff as Ballerina
Avind Haerum as Harrison Bergeron
Frank Dolan as Short Order Cook
Susan Sullivan as Nancy
Charles White as Lionel J. Howard
Philip Bruns as Announcer
Ariane Munker as Wanda June
Page Johnson as Hitler
MacIntyre Dixon as Cemetery Gardener

See also
 List of American films of 1972

References

External links

I have seen the future – and it slurps: A two part conversation between Kurt Vonnegut and Adrian Mitchell (BBC Two, 1972) which bracketed a broadcast of Between Time and Timbuktu

1972 films
1972 television films
1970s fantasy comedy-drama films
Films about astronauts
Films based on works by Kurt Vonnegut
American films based on plays
PBS original programming
Works by Kurt Vonnegut
American fantasy comedy-drama films
1972 comedy films
1972 drama films
1970s English-language films
American drama television films
Films directed by Fred Barzyk
Films with screenplays by David Odell
1970s American films